The 2013 season was the New Orleans Saints' 47th in the National Football League and their 38th playing home games at the Mercedes-Benz Superdome. It also marked the seventh season under head coach Sean Payton, who returned to the team after serving a one-year suspension for his involvement in the team's 2012 bounty scandal.

The Saints improved their 7–9 record from last season, going 11–5 and making the playoffs as the sixth seed. They earned the franchise's first-ever road postseason victory, with a 26–24 win over the Philadelphia Eagles in the Wild Card round, ending the drought at 0–5. However, the Saints were eliminated by the eventual Super Bowl champion Seattle Seahawks in the divisional round, by a score of 23–15. The 2013 season was also the second time in three years the Saints went 8–0 at home.

Offseason

Signings

Re-Signings

Departures

2013 draft class

Notes
The Saints did not have selections in the second, fourth, or seventh rounds. They forfeited their second-round selection as part of the punishment for the team's 2012 bounty scandal. They acquired the No. 82 selection in a trade that sent two fourth-round selections, Nos. 106 and 109 overall, to the Miami Dolphins. The No. 106 selection had been acquired in a trade that sent running back Chris Ivory to the New York Jets. The Saints traded their seventh-round selection to the Seattle Seahawks in exchange for linebacker Barrett Ruud.

Staff

Final roster

Preseason

Regular season

Schedule

Note: Intra-division opponents are in bold text.

Game summaries

Week 1: vs. Atlanta Falcons
With the win against Atlanta, the Saints began their season to 1-0.

Week 2: at Tampa Bay Buccaneers
Coming off a Week 1 win against Atlanta, the Saints face the Buccaneers. The Saints, however, had a close win against Tampa Bay, thus improving them to 2-0.

Week 3: vs. Arizona Cardinals
After a 2-0 start, they face the Cardinals. With a destruction win of 31-7, they improve to 3-0.

Week 4: vs. Miami Dolphins
They face the Dolphins at home. With the victory, they improve to 4-0.

Week 5: at Chicago Bears
With the win at Chicago, they improve to 5-0. This was the second time the Saints beat the Bears.

Week 6: at New England Patriots
The Saints meet the Patriots on the road. With a close loss, the Saints drop to 5-1, thus stopping their 5-game win streak.

Week 8: vs. Buffalo Bills
Coming off a loss to New England on the road, they face the Bills at home. With the win, they improve to 6-1.

Week 9: at New York Jets
Coming off with the win against Buffalo, they face the Jets on the road. Because of Demario Davis being their linebacker for New York (who eventually came to New Orleans in 2018), the Saints would lose this game, thus making their record 6-2.

Week 10: vs. Dallas Cowboys
The Saints would beat the Cowboys at home in the Superdome. This improves their record to 7-2.

Week 11: vs. San Francisco 49ers
The Saints eventually beat the defending NFC Champions, San Francisco 49ers. With the victory, they improve to 8-2.

Week 12: at Atlanta Falcons
The Saints beat the Falcons on the road. This not only brought the Saints' record to 9-2, but they also sweep the Falcons for the first time since the 2011 season.

Week 13: at Seattle Seahawks
In a Monday Night matchup, the Saints were dominated from the start by the Seahawks.  Russell Wilson threw for 310 yard and three touchdowns and rushed for another 47 yards while Seattle's "Legion of Boom" defense limited Drew Brees to 147 yards passing.  The loss brought the Saints record down to 9-3.

Week 14: vs. Carolina Panthers
The Saints would beat the Panthers 31-13, thus improving to 10-3.

Week 15: at St. Louis Rams
The Saints meet the Rams on the road. The Rams, however, were able to hold onto their victory. The Saints drop to 10-4.

Week 16: at Carolina Panthers
At Bank of America Stadium, the Saints meet the Panthers again. The Saints fall to a close loss by 4 points. This drops their record to 10–5. This loss cost the Saints clinching a playoff berth, the NFC South, and a first-round bye. In addition, the Panthers moved ahead of the Saints in the NFC South.

Week 17: vs. Tampa Bay Buccaneers
The Saints were able to sweep the Tampa Bay Buccaneers for the second straight season with the victory. They not only finish the season with 11-5, but they also become the visitors for the Philadelphia Eagles at Lincoln Financial Field in Philadelphia, Pennsylvania.

Standings

Division

Conference

Postseason

Schedule

Game summaries

NFC Wild Card Round: at #3 Philadelphia Eagles
In their first playoff matchup since the 2006 season, the Saints defeated the Eagles and earned their first ever postseason win on the road. Drew Brees threw for 250 yards and one touchdown, Mark Ingram rushed for 97 yards and another touchdown, and Shayne Graham went 4-for-4 on field goals, including the game winner with no time left on the clock.  Graham started the scoring with a 36-yard field goal in the second quarter.  Philadelphia struck back with a 10-yard touchdown pass from Nick Foles to Riley Cooper, but Graham hit another field goal at the end of the half to pull the Saints to within one at 7-6.  Early in the third quarter the Saints got their first touchdown when Brees connected with Lance Moore for a 24-yard touchdown pass to take a 13-7 lead, and the Saints extended it to 20-7 on a one-yard run by Ingram.  However, Philadelphia came back with a touchdown drive of their own to pull to within six at 20-14 on the strength of a 40-yard completion from Foles to DeShaun Jackson to the Saints 9-yard line and a one-yard run by McCoy for the TD.  The Eagles got the ball back in the fourth quarter and pulled to within three on the strength of a 31-yard field goal by Eagles K Alex Henery.  The Saints responded with Graham's third field of the night from 35 yards out to make the score 23-17, but Philadelphia went on a 73-yard drive to take the lead, aided by a pass interference on Saints cornerback Corey White and a three-yard touchdown pass from Foles to TE Zach Ertz.  On the ensuing kickoff, Saints returner Darren Sproles returned the ball to the Saints 37 and then had fifteen more tacked on because of a horse-collar tackle by the Eagles' Cary Williams.  Brees then methodically led the Saints on a 10-play, 34-yard drive to the Eagles' 14 where Graham put his fourth field goal through the uprights for a 26-24 lead as time expired.

NFC Divisional Round: at #1 Seattle Seahawks
In a much different game than the earlier Monday Night Football matchup, the Saints lost to the Seahawks under stormy and freezing conditions in Seattle.  Despite Drew Brees' 309 yards passing, the Saints fumbled once and PK Shane Graham missed two field goal attempts.  Seattle jumped out to a 16-0 lead on three Stephen Hauschka field goals and a 15-yard touchdown run by Marshawn Lynch.  The Saints got back into the game in the fourth quarter with a 1-yard touchdown rush by Khiry Robinson and a two-point conversion run by Mark Ingram.  However, Seattle struck again, this time with a 31-yard touchdown rush by Lynch.  The Saints scored their final touchdown on a 9-yard pass from Brees to Marques Colston with only 26 seconds remaining, but the Saints had a chance to tie the game when they recovered the onsides kick.  A final attempt at a pass followed by laterals fell short as time expired, sending Seattle to the NFC Championship and the Saints home with a 12-6 record. Lynch finished with a game-high 140 yards on 28 attempts for Seattle while Colston caught 11 balls for 144 yards in a losing effort for the Saints.

References

External links
 2013 New Orleans Saints at Pro-Football-Reference.com

New Orleans
New Orleans Saints seasons
New